Fashionable Fakers is a 1923 American silent comedy film directed by William Worthington and starring Johnnie Walker, Mildred June and Lillian Lawrence. It was released in Britain with the alternative title A Going Concern.

Synopsis
Thaddeus, an employee at a furniture store who is hired by his unscrupulous boss to doctor furniture to make it seem antique, buys an oriental rug that turns out to have magical powers. Dramatically his luck improves and he marries his sweetheart and gains enough money to buy the shop.

Cast
 Johnnie Walker as Thaddeus Plummer
 Mildred June as Clara Ridder
 George Cowl as 	Creel
 J. Farrell MacDonald as 	Pat O'Donnell 
 Lillian Lawrence as 	Mrs. Ridder
 Robert Balder as Mr. Carter

References

Bibliography
 Connelly, Robert B. The Silents: Silent Feature Films, 1910-36, Volume 40, Issue 2. December Press, 1998.
 Munden, Kenneth White. The American Film Institute Catalog of Motion Pictures Produced in the United States, Part 1. University of California Press, 1997.

External links
 

1923 films
1923 comedy films
1920s English-language films
American silent feature films
Silent American comedy films
Films directed by William Worthington
American black-and-white films
Film Booking Offices of America films
1920s American films